Juan Gómez González (26 June 1924 – 9 May 2009) was a Mexican football midfielder who played for Mexico national team in the 1954 FIFA World Cup.

Gómez played for Club Atlas, helping the club win its only Primera División championship in 1951.

References

External links
FIFA profile

1926 births
2009 deaths
Mexican footballers
Mexico international footballers
Association football midfielders
Atlas F.C. footballers
1954 FIFA World Cup players